Jorunna hartleyi is a species of sea slug, a dorid nudibranch, a shell-less marine gastropod mollusc in the family Discodorididae.

Distribution
This species was described from northwestern Kawau Island, Victoria, Australia. It is reported from Tasmania.

References

Discodorididae
Gastropods described in 1958